Katja Rajaniemi is a Finnish ski-orienteering competitor. She won a bronze medal in the sprint at the 2005 World Ski Orienteering Championships.

See also
 Finnish orienteers
 List of orienteers
 List of orienteering events

References

Finnish orienteers
Female orienteers
Ski-orienteers
Year of birth missing (living people)
Living people